Alonso Andrada (1590 – 20 June 1672) was a biographer and ascetic writer.

Andrada was born in Toledo, Spain.  Before entering the Society of Jesus (1612) he read philosophy in Toledo, was afterwards rector of Plascensia and minister in foreign countries.

In his declining years, he wrote some thirty-four volumes on different subjects, some worthy of note for their learning, excellence of doctrine, and style, which to some extent conceal his carelessness and excessive simplicity. He is chiefly known as the continuator of Nuremberg's Varones Ilustres, biographies of distinguished members of the Society of Jesus. His Guia de la Virtud e Imitacion de Nuestra Senora deserves special mention. He died in Madrid.

References

1590 births
1672 deaths
People from Toledo, Spain
17th-century Spanish Jesuits